Hervé de Toulgoët (28 March 1911 – 14 September 2009) was a French entomologist. He specialised in moths of the families Arctiidae and Zygaenidae. He also studied the beetle genus Carabus. He was written about by Paul Thiaucourt and Jocelyne Navatte.

According to Navatte's note, Toulgoët published 179 works. On the genus Carabus, he published a catalogue of the types of the Paris National Museum of Natural History collection. On the Zygaenidae he published a note on some Moroccan species. His other works are mainly on Arctiidae.

Taxa 
Hervé de Toulgoët described 432 new species, and the following 31 genera:

 Afroarctia Toulgoët, 1978
 Agaltara Toulgoët, 1979
 Alepista Toulgoët, 1976
 Astacosia Toulgoët, 1958
 Axiopaenella Toulgoët, 1956
 Bryonola Toulgoët, 1955
 Coiffaitarctia Toulgoët, 1990
 Cristulosia Toulgoët, 1958
 Disparctia Toulgoët, 1978
 Ennomomima Toulgoët, 1990
 Eucyanoides Toulgoët, 1988
 Exilisia Toulgoët, 1958
 Galtarodes Toulgoët, 1980
 Kiriakoffalia Toulgoët, 1978
 Kiriakoffia Toulgoët, 1978
 Lalanneia Toulgoët, 1989
 Metexilisia Toulgoët, 1958
 Mimulosia Toulgoët, 1958
 Novosia Toulgoët, 1958
 Parexilisia Toulgoët, 1958
 Paulianosia Toulgoët, 1958
 Praemastus Toulgoët, 1991
 Proxhyle Toulgoët, 1959
 Pseudamastus Toulgoët, 1985
 Pseudogaltara Toulgoët, 1979
 Senecauxia Toulgoët, 1989
 Spatulosia Toulgoët, 1965
 Turlinia Toulgoët, 1976
 Venedictoffia Toulgoët, 1977
 Viettesia Toulgoët, 1959
 Watsonidia Toulgoët, 1981

Many taxa have also been named in honour of Toulgoët:

 Anticleora toulgoeti Viette, 1979
 Blechroneromia toulgoeti Viette, 1976
 Boloria aquilonaris toulgoeti Crosson du Cormier & Guérin, 1959
 Carabus toulgoeti Deuve, 1989
 Cabera toulgoeti Herbulot, 1956
 Cargolia toulgoeti Herbulot, 1988
 Chorenta toulgoeti Dalens, Touroult & tavakilian, 2010
 Chrysochroa toulgoeti Descarpentries, 1982
 Clemensia toulgoeti Gibeaux, 1983
 Cleora toulgoetae Herbulot, 1961
 Coscinia toulgoeti Rungs, 1957
 Cyclocephala toulgoeti Dechambre, 1992
 Detoulgoetia Dubatolov, 2006
 Digama sagittata toulgoeti Viette, 1970
 Echeta toulgoeti Navatte, 2005
 Ethioterpia toulgoeti Viette, 1961
 Eucamptognathus toulgoeti Deuve, 1986
 Eucyane toulgoetae Gibeaux, 1982
 Eupithecia toulgoeti Herbulot, 1993
 Fodina toulgoeti Viette, 1979
 Formozotroctes toulgoeti Tavakilian & Néouze, 2007
 Goniotropis toulgoeti Deuve, 2005
 Gymnogramma toulgoeti Gibeaux, 1982
 Homoeocera toulgoeti Lesieur, 1984
 Lemairegisa toulgoeti Thiaucourt, 1987
 Maliattha toulgoeti Viette, 1965
 Mallocampa toulgoeti Rougeot, 1977
 Micralarctia toulgoeti Watson, 1988
 Neothysanis toulgoeti Herbulot, 1993
 Odontoptera toulgoeti Bourgoin & O'Brien, 1994
 Olepa toulgoeti Ohrant, 1986
 Pachyteles toulgoeti Deuve, 2005
 Paracles toulgoeti Watson & Goodger, 1986
 Pheia toulgoeti Cerda, 2008
 Phileurus toulgoeti Dechambre, 1996
 Pseudautomeris toulgoeti Lemaire, 2002
 Ptenomela toulgoeti Soula, 2002
 Rifargia toulgoeti Thiaucourt, 1980
 Schausiella toulgoeti Lemaire, 1969
 Synalamis toulgoeti Lalanne-Cassou, 1992
 Toulgarctia Dubatolov et Haynes, 2008
 Toulgoetia Herbulot, 1946
 Toulgoetodes Leraut, 1988
 Toulgoetodes toulgoeti Herbulot, 1988
 Zamarada toulgoeti Herbulot, 1979

Notes and references

1911 births
2009 deaths
French lepidopterists
Presidents of the Société entomologique de France
20th-century French zoologists